The 30th Golden Bell Awards was held on 25 March 1995 at the Sun Yat-sen Memorial Hall in Taipei, Taiwan. The ceremony was broadcast by CTS and did not have any host.''

Winners

References

1995
1995 in Taiwan